{{Speciesbox
| image =Vexillum acuminatum 001.jpg
| image_caption = Shells of Vexillum acuminatum (museum specimens at Naturalis Biodiversity Center)
| taxon = Vexillum acuminatum
| authority = (Gmelin, 1791)
| synonyms_ref =
| synonyms =
 Mitra crebrilirata Reeve, 1844
 Mitra elata Röding, P.F. 1798
 Mitra layardii Adams, A. 1855
 Mitra polita Reeve, 1844  junior subjective synonym
 Mitra rosea Kiener, L.C. 1838-1839
 Vexillum (Costellaria) acuminatum (Gmelin, 1791) accepted, alternate representation
 Vexillum crebrilirata [sic] (incorrect gender ending)
 Vexillum crebriliratum (Reeve, 1844)
 Voluta acuminata Gmelin, 1791 (original combination)
|display_parents= 3
}}Vexillum acuminatum, common name the acuminate mitre, is a species of small sea snail, marine gastropod mollusk in the family Costellariidae, the ribbed miters.

Description
The size of the shell varies between 12 mm and 42 mm.

Distribution
This marine species occurs in the Indo-West Pacific; also off New Caledonia and Australia (Northern Territory, Queensland, Western Australia).

References

  Röding, P.F. 1798. Museum Boltenianum sive Catalogus cimeliorum e tribus regnis naturae quae olim collegerat Joa. Hamburg : Trappii 199 pp. 
 Kiener, L.C. 1838-1839. Spécies général et Iconographie des coquilles vivantes, comprenant la collection du Muséum d'histoire Naturelle de Paris, la collection de Lamarck, celle du Prince Massena (appartenant maintenant a M. le Baron B. Delessert) et les découvertes récentes des voyageurs. Paris : Ballière Vol. 3 pp. 1-120.
 Adams, A. 1855. Description of thirty-nine new species of shells, from the collection of Hugh Cuming. Proceedings of the Zoological Society of London 1854(22): 130-138, pl. 28
 Melvill, J.C. & Standen, R. 1901. The Mollusca of the Persian Gulf, Gulf of Oman, and the Arabian Sea, as evidenced mainly through the collections of Mr. F.W. Townsend, 1893-1900; with descriptions of new species. Proceedings of the Zoological Society of London 1901(ii): 327-460 pls xxi-xxiv
 Schepman, M.M. 1911. The Prosobranchia of the Siboga Expedition. Part 4: Rhachiglossa. pp. 247-364, pls 18-24 in Weber, M. (ed.). Siboga Expeditie. Monograph 49.
 Dautzenberg, P. & Bouge, L.J. 1923. Mitridés de la Nouvelle-Calédonie et de ses dépendances. Journal de Conchyliologie 67(2): 179-259
 Cernohorsky, W.O. 1970. Systematics of the families Mitridae & Volutomitridae (Mollusca: Gastropoda). Bulletin of the Auckland Institute and Museum. Auckland, New Zealand 8: 1-190
 Tantanasiriwong, R. 1978. An illustrated checklist of marine shelled gastropods from Phuket Island, adjacent mainland and offshore islands, Western Peninsula, Thailand. Phuket Marine Biological Center, Research Bulletin 21: 1-22, 259 figs 
 Wilson, B. 1994. Australian marine shells. Prosobranch gastropods. Kallaroo, WA : Odyssey Publishing Vol. 2 370 pp. 
 Salisbury, R.A. 1999. Costellariidae of the World, Pt. 1. Of Sea and Shore 22(3): 124-136 
 Salisbury, R. 2000. Costellariidae of the World, Pt. 4. Of Sea and Shore 23(2): 70-84 
 Turner H. 2001. Katalog der Familie Costellariidae'' Macdonald, 1860. Conchbooks. 1-100 page(s): 14
 Arnaud, J.P., Berthault, C., Jeanpierre, R., Martin, J.C. & Martin, P. 2002. Costellariidae et Mitridae de Nouvelle Calédonie. Xenophora. Association française de conchyliologie. Supplément 100: 52 pp.
 Thach, N.N. 2002. The miters of Vietnam. Of Sea and Shore 25(1): 40-51 [

External links
  Gmelin, J. F. (1791). Vermes. In: Gmelin J.F. (Ed.) Caroli a Linnaei Systema Naturae per Regna Tria Naturae, Ed. 13. Tome 1(6). G.E. Beer, Lipsiae
 Reeve, L. A. (1844-1845). Monograph of the genus Mitra. In: Conchologia Iconica, or, illustrations of the shells of molluscous animals, vol. 2, pl. 1-39 and unpaginated text. L. Reeve & Co., London. 
  Cernohorsky, Walter Oliver. The Mitridae of Fiji; The veliger vol. 8 (1965)

acuminatum
Gastropods described in 1791
Taxa named by Johann Friedrich Gmelin